The Bachem Ba 349 Natter was a World War II German point-defence rocket-powered interceptor, which was to be used in a very similar way to a manned surface-to-air missile. After a vertical take-off, which eliminated the need for airfields, most of the flight to the Allied bombers was to be controlled by an autopilot. The primary role of the relatively untrained pilot was to aim the aircraft at its target bomber and fire its armament of rockets. The pilot and the fuselage containing the rocket motor would then land using separate parachutes, while the nose section was disposable.

The first and only manned vertical take-off flight, on 1 March 1945, ended in the death of the test pilot, Lothar Sieber.

Development

Background
In 1943, Luftwaffe air superiority was being challenged by the Allies over the Reich and radical innovations were required to overcome the crisis. Surface-to-air missiles appeared to be a promising approach to counter the Allied strategic bombing offensive; a variety of projects were started, but invariably problems with the guidance and homing systems prevented any of these from attaining operational status. Providing the missile with a pilot, who could operate a weapon during the brief terminal approach phase, offered a solution.

A number of simple designs were proposed, including the Heinkel P.1077 Julia, in which the pilot lay prone (on his stomach), to reduce the frontal area.

The Julia was the front-runner for the contract. The initial plan was to launch the aircraft vertically, but this concept was later changed to a conventional horizontal take-off from a tricycle-wheeled trolley, similar to that used by the first eight prototypes of the Arado Ar 234 jet reconnaissance bomber.

Bachem's proposal
Erich Bachem's BP-20 ("Natter") was a development from a design he had worked on at Fieseler, the Fi 166 concept, but considerably more radical than the other submissions. It was built using glued and nailed wooden parts with an armour-plated bulkhead and bulletproof glass windshield at the front of the cockpit. The initial plan was to power the machine with a Walter HWK 109-509A-2 rocket motor; however, only the 109-509A-1, as used in the Me 163, was available. By the time the aircraft left the tower it was hoped that it would have achieved sufficient speed to allow its aerodynamic surfaces to provide stable flight.

Under operational conditions, once the Natter had left the launcher, it would be guided to the proximity of the Allied bombers by an autopilot with the possibility of an added beam guidance similar to that used in some V-2 rocket launches. Only then would the pilot take control, aim and fire the armament, which was originally proposed to be a salvo of nineteen 55mm R4M rockets. Later, 28 R4Ms or a number of the larger, 73mm Henschel Hs 297 Föhn rockets were suggested, with either variety of unguided rocket fired from the Natter's nose-mounted cellular launch tubes. The Natter was intended to fly up and over the bombers, by which time its Walter motor would probably be out of propellant. The fuselage would decelerate and the pilot would be ejected forwards by his own inertia and land by means of a personal parachute.

In an early proposal in August 1944, the Natter design had a concrete nose; it was suggested that the machine might ram a bomber, but this proposal was subsequently withdrawn in later Project Natter outlines. Bachem stated clearly in the initial proposal that the Natter was not a suicide weapon and much effort went into designing safety features for the pilot. However, owing to the potential dangers for the pilot inherent in the operation of this precarious aircraft, the Natter is sometimes listed as a suicide craft. The design had one decisive advantage over its competitors – it eliminated the necessity to land an unpowered gliding machine at an airbase, which, as the history of the Me 163 rocket aircraft had clearly demonstrated, made an aircraft extremely vulnerable to attack by Allied fighters.

Modifications
Heinrich Himmler became interested in Bachem's design. The Reichsführer-SS granted Bachem an interview and fully supported the project. In the middle of September 1944, the Technical Office of the Waffen-SS made an order for Bachem to develop and manufacture the Natter at his Waldsee factory. During December 1944, the project came largely under the control of the SS and Hans Kammler. This decision is said to have been the only time the SS significantly interfered with aircraft design and air fighting strategy. Early-on in the project, the Reichsluftfahrtministerium (RLM) undertook an engineering assessment of the Natter, which it reported on 28 October 1944.

The Natter was designed to be built by unskilled labor with poor-quality tools and inexpensive material. Various stringent economies were imposed on an already frugal design. The Natter had no landing gear, which saved weight, expense and construction time. Consequently, one of the most unusual features of the machine was the escape of the pilot and recovery of the machine.

The proposed sequence of these events was as follows: After the attack, the Natter might dive to a lower altitude and flatten out into level flight. The pilot would then proceed with a well-practised escape sequence. He would open the cockpit canopy latch, which would allow the canopy to flick backwards on its hinge in the airstream. Next, the pilot would undo his seat belt and remove his feet from the rudder pedal stirrups. By squeezing a lever mounted on the control column, he would release a lock at the base of the column, which would allow him to tilt the column forwards where it could engage in and undo a safety latch for the nose release mechanism. He would then lean a little further forward and pull a lever hinged near the floor at the front of the cockpit, freeing the nose section, which self-jettisoned as a result of the reduced aerodynamic pressure at the front of the fuselage.

As the nose section separated, it was intended to briefly pull on two cables that released a small ribbon parachute stored on the starboard side of the rear fuselage. The parachute subsequently opened and decelerated the Natter. The pilot would be ejected from the cockpit by his own inertia and as soon as he was clear of the fuselage, he would open his personal parachute and descend to the ground. A parachute was to eject the valuable Walter rocket motor from the rear, which would decelerate the aircraft and eject the pilot with inertia, however, associated problems with this mechanism were still not fully resolved prior to the conflict's end.

Professor Wilhelm Fuchs reportedly calculated the Natter's aerodynamics at the Technische Hochschule, Aachen using a large analog computer. Wind tunnel testing on a wooden model, scaled to 40% of full size, was performed at the Deutsche Versuchsanstalt für Luftfahrt (DVL), the Institute for Aerodynamics at Berlin-Adlershof in September 1944 at speeds up to 504 km/h. Results from these tests were reported in January 1945 to the Bachem-Werk. Further model tests were carried out at the Luftfahrtforschungsanstalt Hermann Göring (LFA) facility in Völkenrode-Braunschweig, at speeds close to Mach 1. In March the Bachem-Werk simply received a statement that satisfactory flying qualities should be expected with speeds up to 1,100 km/h.

Flight testing
Construction of the first experimental prototype Natter, Versuchsmuster 1, was completed on 4 October 1944. V1 was subsequently referred to as Baumuster1 (BM1) and later still the "B" was dropped and the machine became known as the M1. Most subsequent prototypes were known by 'M' codes, as the later prototypes of the Heinkel He 162 were. Manned glider flights began on 3 November 1944. The first glider M1 was towed to around 3,000 m by a Heinkel He 111 bomber with a cable (Tragschlepp mode) at Neuburg an der Donau. The pilot was Erich Klöckner, who made all four documented Tragschlepp ("towed") flights.

After carrying out the test programme of the M1, he bailed out and the machine crashed into the ground. It was found that the towing cable, and in the case of the M3, the undercarriage interfered with the flight characteristics of the gliders and consequently the results were difficult to interpret. To clear any lingering doubts about the Natter in the glider mode, Hans Zübert made a daring free flight in the M8 on 14 February, and showed that the Natter was indeed a very good flying machine.

The vertical take-off trials were conducted on high ground called the Ochsenkopf at the Truppenübungsplatz (military training area) Heuberg near Stetten am kalten Markt, Württemberg. The first successful unmanned vertical take-off from the experimental launch tower occurred on 22 December 1944. The test machine, the M16, was powered only by the Schmidding solid boosters, as were all the early vertical launch trials. Up to and including 1 March 1945, 16 prototypes had been used, eight in glider trials and eight in VTO trials.

Manned test flight
By January 1945, Bachem was under pressure from the authorities in Berlin to carry out a manned flight by the end of February. On 25 February, M22 was in the experimental launch tower. It was as complete an operational machine as possible with the Walter HWK 109-509 A1 motor installed for the first time. A dummy pilot was in the cockpit. Lift-off from the tower was perfect. The nose separated as programmed and the dummy pilot descended safely under its personal parachute. The remainder of the fuselage came down under its two large salvage parachutes, but when it hit the ground the Walter liquid-propellant rocket motor's residual hypergolic propellants (T-Stoff oxidizer and C-Stoff fuel) exploded and the machine was destroyed.

Despite Bachem's concerns that the test programme had been significantly cut short, a young volunteer Luftwaffe test pilot, Lothar Sieber, climbed into the cockpit of the fully fuelled M23 on 1 March. The aircraft was equipped with an FM transmitter for the purpose of transmitting flight data from various monitoring sensors in the machine. A hard wire intercom appears to have been provided between Sieber and the engineers in the launch bunker using a system similar to that used in the manned glider flights. Around 1100 am, the M23 was ready for take-off. Low stratus clouds lay over the Ochsenkopf. The Walter liquid-fueled rocket motor built up to full thrust and Sieber pushed the button to ignite the four solid boosters.

At about  the cockpit canopy was seen to fly off. The Natter continued to climb at high speed at an angle of 15° from the horizontal and disappeared into the clouds. The Walter motor stalled about 15 seconds after take-off. It is estimated the Natter reached , at which point it nose-dived and hit the ground with great force about 32 seconds later, some kilometres from the launch site. Unknown at the time, one of the Schmidding boosters failed to jettison and its remains were dug up at the crash site in 1998.

The pilot was likely unconscious long before the crash. Bachem surmised Sieber had involuntarily pulled back on the control column under the effect of the 3 G acceleration. Examination of the canopy, which fell near the launch site, showed the tip of the latch was bent, suggesting it may not have been in the fully closed position at launch.

The accident reinforced Bachem's long held belief that the take-off and flight in the vicinity of the target bombers should be fully automated. The canopy latch was strengthened and the headrest was attached to the backboard of the cockpit. Before the introduction of the autopilot in the test programme, the control column would have a temporary locking device on it, which would allow the machine to ascend vertically to at least  and then be removed by the pilot. The Walter motor probably ceased operation because the Natter was virtually upside-down and air may have entered the intake pipes in the propellant tanks, starving the motor. Sieber had become the first man to take off vertically from the ground under pure rocket power, 16 years before Yuri Gagarin's Vostok 1 pioneering, peacetime orbital flight. Following Sieber's death, all of the eight subsequent Natter flights were unmanned.

Production
The SS ordered 150 Natters, and the Luftwaffe ordered 50, but none were delivered by the end of the war. Much debate has surrounded the number of Natters built at the Bachem-Werk and their disposition. According to Bachem, 36 Natters were produced at the Bachem-Werk in Waldsee by the end of the war.  Up to April 1945, 17 aircraft had been used in unmanned trials comprising five gliders, all slung under an He 111 in the Mistelschlepp configuration prior to launch, and 12 VTO examples. Five aircraft were prepared for manned trials, four gliders and one VTO version. The M3 was flown twice, and then rebuilt at which time it was given the new code BM3a but was never flown. The total number of launches to early April 1945 was 22, as was the total number of Natters constructed up to that time. Bachem reported further that there were 14 more finished or almost finished aircraft in April 1945. Four of these were prototype A1 operational Natters built for test launching from a wooden pole launcher, which had been designed for field deployment. This new launcher was also constructed on the Heuberg, not far from the experimental steel tower. There is documentary evidence for two pole launches in April but not three as claimed by Bachem in his post-war presentation. The documentation for this third flight may have been destroyed by the SS at war's end. Ten A1 operational Natters, called K-Maschinen, were constructed for the Krokus-Einsatz ("Operation Crocus").

The fate of these 14 A1 Natters was as follows:
Three were fired from the vertical launch tower according to Bachem, four were burnt at Waldsee, two were burnt at Lager Schlatt, Oetztal, Austria, four were captured by US troops at Sankt Leonhard im Pitztal, Austria, and one, which had been sent as a sample model to a new factory in Thuringia, was captured by the Red Army. Consequently, the total of 36 test and operational aircraft constructed at the Bachem-Werk can be accounted for. However, Natter carcasses were used for a variety of ground-based purposes; for example, as a static booster rocket, armament and strength testing and pilot seat position tests. Some fuselages were reused after flight testing; for example, the M5, 6 and 7.

Of the four Natters captured at Sankt Leonhard im Pitztal, two went to the United States. Only one original Natter built in Germany in the Second World War survives in storage at the Paul E. Garber Preservation, Restoration, and Storage Facility in Suitland, Maryland, under the auspices of the Smithsonian Institution. The fate of the other Natter brought to the US is unknown. There is no documentary evidence that a Natter was ever flown from Muroc Field. The tail section of one of the Natters at Sankt Leonhard im Pitztal was broken off while it still rested on its trailer.

Stability
In early February 1945, the positions of the centre of gravity for the A1 operational machine during its flight profile were giving the RLM and the SS cause for concern. They wanted these figures to be decided upon for the upcoming construction of the A1 aircraft for Krokus-Einsatz (Operation Crocus), the field deployment of the Natter. The position of the centre of gravity is expressed as a percentage of the chord (distance between the leading and trailing edges) of the main wing. Thus 0% is the leading edge and 100% is the trailing edge. In the manned glider trials the centre of gravity had been varied between 20 and 34%.

At a meeting of engineers held on 8 February, the variations in the centre of gravity expected in the A1 Krokus machine were discussed. At take-off with the weight of the four solid boosters, the centre of gravity would be brought back to 65%, but after releasing these rockets it would move forwards to 22%. The free flight by Zübert on 14 February had showed unequivocally that the little Natter had excellent flying characteristics as a glider. The centre of gravity problem was solved initially by the addition of one-metre-square auxiliary tailfins that were released simultaneously with the jettisoning of the boosters. The Krokus aircraft had vanes that would direct the Walter rocket exhaust gases so as to assist vehicle stabilisation at low speed similar to those used in the V-2 rocket.

Legacy

By 25 April 1945, French forces had captured Waldsee and presumably took control of the Bachem-Werk. Shortly before the French troops arrived, a group of Bachem-Werk personnel set out for Austria with five A1 Natters on trailers. At Bad Wörishofen, the group waited for another squad retreating from Nabern unter Teck with one completed Natter. Both groups then set out for the Austrian Alps. One group with two Natters ended up at the junction of the river Inn and one of its tributaries, the Ötztaler Ache, at Camp Schlatt. The other group went to St. Leonhard im Pitztal with four aircraft. US troops captured the first group at Camp Schlatt around 4 May and the second group on the following day.

At some time during the project, the Bachem-Werk was ordered to give complete details of the BP-20 Natter to the Japanese, but there was doubt over whether they had received them. They were, however, known to have a general knowledge of the Natter and showed considerable interest in the project.

Operation Krokus launch pads at Hasenholz wood
An operational launch site for the first Ba 349A-1 operational Natters under the code name Operation Krokus was being established in a small wooded area called Hasenholz, south of the Stuttgart to Munich autobahn and to the east of Nabern unter Teck. Around the end of February and the beginning of March the Organisation Todt was in action, constructing each set of the trios of concrete foundations (or "footings") for the launch towers. These three launch pads and their towers were arranged at the corners of an equilateral triangle, 120 m per side. In the centre of each of the three concrete footings is a square hole approximately 50 centimeters deep, which once served as the foundation for the launch tower. Beside each hole is a pipe, cut off at ground level, which was probably once a cable pit. These three concrete pads were noticed by a surveyor in the autumn of 1945, but not rediscovered until 1999.

On 27 January, eight pilots volunteered for the first operational flights and started familiarizing themselves with the Natter at Bachem's factory on 5 February. This training continued until the beginning of April. The pilots were expecting to fly three combat-ready Natters on 20 April, which was Hitler's birthday, but were unaware that the launch pads were still incomplete. But on that day the US 10th Armored Division drove its tanks into Kirchheim unter Teck to the northwest of Hasenholz wood. The next day it crossed the autobahn and headed straight for the Natter operational area. The Natter group subsequently retreated to Waldsee.

Surviving aircraft and replicas

Only one original A1 Natter survives; it is stored in the Paul E. Garber Preservation, Restoration and Storage Facility in Suitland, Maryland, US. It is in a poor state of repair and is no longer accessible to the general public. The evidence supports the proposition that this machine was captured by US troops at St. Leonhard im Pitztal, Austria in May 1945.

The Natter displayed at the Deutsches Museum is said to have been reconstructed partly from sub-assemblies that survived the end of the war. This machine is of the experimental type as launched from the steel tower and is painted to look like an M17. There are several static reproductions of Natters around the world, for example at the Planes of Fame Air Museum, Chino, California and Fantasy of Flight, Polk City, Florida, US.

Film
In 2010, Oliver Gortat and Philip Schneider made a documentary film about the Bachem Ba 349.

Specifications (Ba 349B-1)

See also

References

Notes

Citations

Bibliography
 Angelucci, Enzo. The Rand McNally Encyclopedia of Military Aircraft, 1914–1980. San Diego, California: The Military Press, 1983. .
 Bachem, Erich. "Einige grundsätzliche Probleme des Senkrechstarts. Probleme aus der Astronautischen Grundlagenforschung" (in German). Proceedings of the Third International Congress on Astronautics. Stuttgart: Gesellschaft für Weltraumforschung, September 1952.
 Bachem, Erich. "Projekt 'Natter' (BP-20/Barak 1) (in German). Transcript in Horst Lommel, Der erste Raketenstart der Welt. Waldsee-Württemberg: Bachem-Werk GmbH, August 1944.
 Bachem, Erich. "Zur 'Natter'-Frage!" (in German). Bachem-Werk. Waldsee-Württemberg, December 1944.
 Bachem-Werk. "Vorläufiger Kurz-Erprobungsbericht von Gerät 'Natter' Baumuster M16" (in German). Transcript in Horst Lommel, Der erste Raketenstart der Welt. Waldsee-Württemberg, December 1944.
 Bachem-Werk. "Vorläufiger kurzer Erprobungsbericht über M23" (in German). Waldsee-Württemberg, March 1945(a).
 Bachem-Werk. "Wochenbericht Nr. 13 (abgeschlossen am 1-3-45)" (in German). Waldsee-Württemberg, March 1945(b).
 Bachem-Werk (April 1945c). Kurz-Erprobungsbericht. Waldsee-Württemberg.
 de Bok, René and Jules Huf. "Saboteur of collaborateur, Duitse getuigenissen lijnrecht tegenover Bethbeder", Gebhardt quotation (in German). Elseviers Magazine, Zorell, April 1978.
 Bratt, R.W. and J.R. Ewans. Report on the BP-20 aircraft (Natter), Evaluation Report 83., June 1945.
Christopher, John. The Race for Hitler's X-Planes. The Mill, Gloucestershire: History Press, 2013
 Dryden, Hugh L. German Guided Missile Development. Memorandum for the Commanding General Army Air Forces, October 1945.
 Felkin, S.D. Natter – German rocket interceptor. ADI (K), Report No. 303/1945, May 1945.
 Ford, Brian. German Secret Weapons: Blueprint for Mars (Ballantine's Illustrated History of World War II, Weapons Book No. 5). New York: Ballantine Books, 1969. .
Gooden, Brett. Natter: Manned Missile of the Third Reich: Historic Step to Human Spaceflight. Rundle Mall, Australia: Brett Gooden, 2019. 
 Gooden, Brett A. Projekt Natter, Last of the Wonder Weapons: The Luftwaffe's Vertical Take-Off Rocket Interceptor. Crowborough, UK: Classic Publications, 2006. .
 Green, William. Rocket Fighter (Ballantine's Illustrated History of World War II, Weapons Book No. 20). New York: Ballantine Books, 1971. .
 Green, William. Warplanes of the Third Reich (4th (1979) ed.). London: Macdonald and Jane's Publishers Ltd., 1970. .
 Grieger, M. "Fakten der NS-Illusion. Produkte und Projekte der deutschen Rüstungswirtschaft am Ende des zweiten Weltkrieges", quoting NS 33/36, Fol. 10RS(in German). Informationsdienst Wissenschaft und Frieden 8, No. 1, November 1990.
 Klöckner; Kreyser. "Flugprotokoll der Erprobung 'Natter' BM1" (in German). Ainring, November 1944
 Köster. "Projekt 'Natter'. Ballistisch-taktische Stellungnahme, insbesondere für Bewaffung MK 108 bezw, R4M oder Rohr-Batterie 108, TLR/Fl.6/III" (in German). Berling, November 1944.
 De Lattre de Tassigny, Jean. The History of the French First Army. London: George Allen and Unwin Ltd., 1952.
 Lommel, Horst. Das bemannte Geschoß Ba 349 'Natter': Die Technikgeschichte (in German). Zweibrücken: VDM Heinz Nickel, 2000. .
 Lommel, Horst. "Der erste bemannte Raketenstart. Essener Allgemeinen Zeitung; Peter Berthold: 'Ich sah die letzte Wunderwaffen', April 1951.
 Lommel, Horst. Der erste bemannte Raketenstart der Welt (2nd ed.) (in German). Stuttgart: Motorbuch Verlag, 1998. .
 Lommel, Horst. Vom Höhenaufklärer bis zum Raumgleiter: Geheimprojekte der DFS, 1935–1945 (in German). Stuttgart: Motorbuch Verlag, 2000. .
 Magerstädt, Albert. "Flugzeug-Fertigungskennblatt, Baumuster 8-349, Raketenjäger, Natter BP 20" (in German). RLM, October 1944.
 Maloney, Edward T. Kamikaze: The Okha Suicide Flying Bomb, Bachem Ba 349A 'Natter' and Fzg 76 'Reichenberg'  (Aero Series 7). Fallbrook, California: Aero Publishers Inc., 1966.
 Millikan, Clarke B. Natter Interceptor Project. CIOS Report No. XXX-107. London: HMSO, July 1945.
 Miranda, Justo and Paula Mercado. Vertical Takeoff Fighter Aircraft of the Third Reich (Luftwaffe Profile Series No. 17). Atglen, Pennsylvania: Schiffer Publishing, 2001. .
 Myhra, David. Bachem Ba 349 Natter (X-Planes of the Third Reich). Atglen, Pennsylvania: Schiffer Publishing, 1999. .
 Pabst, Otto E. Kurzstarter und Senkrechtstarter Koblenz. Bonn: Bernard & Graefe, 1984, p. 166. .
 Pallud, Jean P. "First manned rocket launch." After the Battle, No. 151. Essex, UK: Battle of Britain International Ltd., February 2011.
 Proctor, G.E.F. German Target-Defence Interceptors, A.I.2 (g), Report No.2347, May 1945.
 Reyle (1998). Technischer Stand Projekt ‘Natter’ End February 1945. Transcript in Horst Lommel, Der erste Raketenstart der Welt. Stuttgart: Motorbuch Verlag.
 Speer, Albert and Ulrich Schlie, ed. Alles, was ich weiß (in German). Munich: F.A. Herbig Verlagsbuchhandlung, 2001. .
 Wacke. Zusammenstellung der 3- u. 6-Komponententenmessung am Gerät 'Natter' (Model BP 20-07) (in German). DVL Berlin-Aldershof: Institute für Aerodynamik, January 1945.
 Wilde. "Besrechung am 20-2-45 in Stetten a. k. M. über Meßwertübertragung aus der Natter." Hochfrequenzabteilung der Forschungsanstalt Graf Zeppelin, February 1945.
 Zübert, Hans. Freiflug M8 14-2-45, Flugbericht der Piloten Zübert (in German). Neuburg: DVL, Berlin-Aldershof, February 1945.

External links 

 Abfangjagdflugzeug Bachem Ba 349 "Natter" (in German)
 U.S. Intelligence Report Photos
 The Adder Affair – Bachem Natter feature from a 1950's issue of RAF Flying review
 YouTube Video Overview of the Bachem Ba 349 Program

Ba 349
1940s German fighter aircraft
Rocket-powered aircraft
Aircraft with auxiliary rocket engines
World War II fighter aircraft of Germany
Research and development in Nazi Germany
Mid-wing aircraft
Aircraft first flown in 1945
Tailsitter aircraft